AQP may refer to:

 Appleton Municipal Airport in Appleton, Minnesota (FAA code)
 Rodríguez Ballón International Airport in Arequipa, Peru (IATA code)
 The protein family of Aquaporins, water channels
 Any Qualified Provider in the English National Health Service (NHS)
 ASQ Quality Press, American Society for Quality